Ministry of Education, or the MOE, is a government branch in the Marshall Islands that controls and takes care of education, as well as all public schools in the Marshall Islands. The Minister of the MOE is one of the senators of the Marshall Islands and is appointed by the president of the Marshall Islands. Wilbur Heine is the current minister.

History

Institutions
Marshall Islands Public School System
 College of the Marshall Islands (CMI)
 National Vocational Training Institute (NVTI)

References

Government of the Marshall Islands
Education ministries